The eighty-second cabinet of Bulgaria also known as the Videnov cabinet was a coalition government in Bulgaria, led by the Bulgarian Socialist Party, which ruled from 25 January 1995 to 12 February 1997. The Socialist-led coalition government resigned after nationwide protests because of hyperinflation, banking crisis and economic collapse.

See also 
History of Bulgaria since 1989

Bulgarian governments
Bulgarian Socialist Party